The Batang River (Chinese: , p Batánghé) or Zha Chu (Chinese: , p Zháqū; Standard Tibetan: Za Qu), whose two sources are Za Qu (w rdza Chu, z Za Qu) and Bai Qu (Tibetan: , w Dpal Chu, z Bä Qu), is an  long river in Yushu Tibetan Autonomous Prefecture, south-eastern Qinghai province, in the People's Republic of China. The river begins in the highlands of central Yushu County and flows easterly through the townships of Batang and Gyêgu before meeting the Tongtian River at the border of Yushu County with Chindu County. The Tongtian is the main stem of the Yangtze River, and its confluence with the Batang is traditionally considered to mark the beginning of the Jinsha section of the Yangtze.

References

Rivers of Qinghai